Baktash Siawash (born 1983 in Kapisa Province) was the youngest member of the Afghanistan Parliament. He was previously a journalist and anchored of political shows on TOLO TV he is now senior political adviser of the speaker of wolsi Jirga (House of Representative) and the founder of the Cultural Front of Afghanistan.https://culturalfrontafghanistan.com

His brother Yama Siawash was murdered in 2020.

References 

Afghan politicians
1983 births
Living people
People from Kapisa Province